Schluchsee is a town in the county of Breisgau-Hochschwarzwald in the German state of Baden-Württemberg. It is located near the Schluchsee reservoir.

References

External links
 Schluchsee: pictures

Breisgau-Hochschwarzwald
Baden